Lebesgue is a small lunar impact crater that is located near the eastern limb of the Moon. It lies in the southeastern part of the Mare Smythii, to the southeast of the crater Warner. The southeastern rim of Lebesgue is attached to a small crater that overlays the northwest rim of Swasey, so that the three form a short crater chain. This is a circular, bowl-shaped crater formation. It is not notably eroded or overlain by impacts.

References

 
 
 
 
 
 
 
 
 
 
 
 

Impact craters on the Moon